Acroschisma is a genus of mosses belonging to the family Andreaeaceae.

The species of this genus are found in Southern America.

Species:
 Acroschisma andensis Spruce

References

Andreaeaceae
Moss genera